Harpalus morvani is a species of ground beetle in the subfamily Harpalinae. It was described by Kataev in 2001.

References

morvani
Beetles described in 2001